Milford  (pop. 1,000) is a rural Canadian village in Nova Scotia's East Hants municipal district and Halifax Regional Municipality in the Shubenacadie Valley . The official community includes the areas of Milford Station and East Milford.

References
Explore HRM
Nova Scotia Place Names

Communities in Halifax, Nova Scotia
General Service Areas in Nova Scotia
Communities in Hants County, Nova Scotia